Filippo Picinelli (1604 - c.1679) was an Augustinian canon.

Biography
Picinelli was born in Milan, Italy in 1604 and joined the Augustinian Order in 1614. He studied philosophy and theology at Cremona and Piacenza, and lived in Milan.
 
Picinelli believed that the world of God's creation could read as a symbolic book. This led him to assemble an encyclopaedia of emblems extending to more than a thousand pages, his Mondo simbolico (Symbolic World).

Books
 Ateneo dei letterati milanesi, Milan, 1670 Ateneo dei letterati milanesi.
 Foeminarum S. Scripturae Elogia, 1694 Latin edition Foeminarum S. Scripturae Elogia: Centuria Singularis
 Labores Apostolici (1711 Latin edition, Vol. 1 Labores Apostolici: Quibus accessêre Sermonis geminati in sesto Nativitatis Domini, ... Cum Indicibus Copiosis Sermonum, Rerum, & Applicationum ad singgulos does Quadragesimae. Labores Apostolici, Exhibiti in Secundo Quadragesimali
 Lumi riflessi, 1667 (1702 Latin edition Lumina reflexaLumina reflexa seu Omnium veterum classicorum ac ethnicorum authorum exactissimus consensus ...: deserviens instar commentarii ad totam S. Scripturam)
 Mondo simbolico, 1635 (1681 Latin edition, Mundus Symbolicus, Vol. 1 Mundus Symbolicus: In Emblematum Universitate Formatus, Explicatus, Et Tam Sacris, quam profanis Eruditionibus ac Sententiis illustratus: Subministrans Oratoribus, ... Innumera Conceptuum Argumenta. Cum quadruplici copiosissimo Indice, Lemmatum, Applicationum, Rerum notabilium, & locorum S. Scripturae. 1; 1687 Latin edition, Vol. 2 Mundus Symbolicus in emblematum universitate formatus, explicatus, et tam sacris, quàm profanis eruditionibus ac sententiis illustratus ...)
 Sacrarum religionum (1696 Latin edition Sacrarum religionum maximae ex Regula S.P.N. Augustini ...: desumptae ac centrum discursibus Italicis explicatae)
 Symbola virginea (1694 Latin edition Symbola virginea, ad honorem mariae matris dei ...)
 Tributa encomiorum (1697 Latin edition Tributa encomiorum: heroicis quorundam sanctorum virtutibus)

References

External links

 4 Enoch 

1604 births
1679 deaths
Augustinian canons
17th-century Italian Roman Catholic theologians